"She's a Woman (And Now He Is a Man)" is a song by Hüsker Dü from their album Warehouse: Songs and Stories. The song was released to radio as a promotional single in 1987 and was written and sung by Grant Hart. 

"She's a Woman (And Now He Is a Man)" was performed by the band on The Late Show with Joan Rivers along with "Could You Be the One?."

Track listing
Side One
"She's a Woman (And Now He Is a Man)" – 3:19 (Hart)
"Ice Cold Ice – 4:23 (Mould)
Side Two
"Charity, Chastity, Prudence and Hope" – 3:11 (Hart)
"No Reservations" – 3:40 (Mould)

References

Hüsker Dü songs
1987 songs
Song recordings produced by Bob Mould
Songs written by Grant Hart